The 6th Michigan Heavy Artillery Regiment was an artillery regiment
that served in the Union Army during the American Civil War.

Service
The 6th Michigan Heavy Artillery was redesignated from the 6th Michigan Volunteer Infantry Regiment at Port Hudson, Louisiana, as a reward for its performance at the Siege of Port Hudson.

The regiment was mustered out on August 20, 1861.

Total strength and casualties
The regiment suffered 2 officers and 76 enlisted men who were killed in action or mortally wounded and 6 officers and 498 enlisted men who died of disease, for a total of 582 fatalities.

Commanders
Colonel
Frederick W. Cortenius

Thomas S. Clark
Captain
S. F. Craig

See also
List of Michigan Civil War Units
Michigan in the American Civil War

Notes

References
The Civil War Archive

Artillery
1865 disestablishments in Michigan
Michigan
1863 establishments in Louisiana
Military units and formations established in 1863
Military units and formations disestablished in 1865